Lesotho competed at the 1984 Summer Olympics in Los Angeles, United States.

Athletics

Men

Boxing

Men

References
Official Olympic Reports

Nations at the 1984 Summer Olympics
1984
1984 in Lesotho sport